The 1978–79 NBA season was the Kings 30th season in the NBA and their seventh season in the city of Kansas City.

Roster

Regular season

Season standings

z - clinched division title
y - clinched division title
x - clinched playoff spot

Record vs. opponents

Playoffs

|- align="center" bgcolor="#ffcccc"
| 1
| April 17
| @ Phoenix
| L 99–102
| Otis Birdsong (20)
| Sam Lacey (12)
| Phil Ford (7)
| Arizona Veterans Memorial Coliseum12,660
| 0–1
|- align="center" bgcolor="#ccffcc"
| 2
| April 20
| Phoenix
| W 111–91
| Otis Birdsong (23)
| Scott Wedman (10)
| Phil Ford (9)
| Kemper Arena13,659
| 1–1
|- align="center" bgcolor="#ffcccc"
| 3
| April 22
| @ Phoenix
| L 93–108
| Wedman, Birdsong (22)
| Bill Robinzine (10)
| three players tied (5)
| Arizona State University Activity Center14,301
| 1–2
|- align="center" bgcolor="#ffcccc"
| 4
| April 25
| Phoenix
| L 94–108
| Scott Wedman (21)
| Sam Lacey (13)
| Lacey, Ford (5)
| Kemper Arena13,184
| 1–3
|- align="center" bgcolor="#ffcccc"
| 5
| April 27
| @ Phoenix
| L 99–120
| Otis Birdsong (21)
| Sam Lacey (10)
| Billy McKinney (7)
| Arizona Veterans Memorial Coliseum12,660
| 1–4
|-

Awards and records
 Phil Ford, NBA Rookie of the Year Award
 Cotton Fitzsimmons, NBA Coach of the Year Award
 Phil Ford, All-NBA Second Team
 Phil Ford, NBA All-Rookie Team 1st Team

References

Sacramento Kings seasons
Kansas City
Kansas
Kansas